The institution of the nattar was well-defined. It was in charge of all matters pertaining to a village, including water-management. It was noted that: "If  ruling class is taken to mean those with the power and authority to manage community resources, then the nattar was this class in Tamil country".

Description

Ceremonial establishments of brahmin villages in the nadus to pursue dharmic ends were important in effecting links beyond the nadu. The brahmadeyas of different nadus created a network of ritual specialists and in doing so fortified the standing of the nattar upon whose patronage this depended. 

Nattar as a political body was recognized by the Pallavas and Pandyas. The Pallava and Pandya copper plates regarding grants of land had nattars mentioned in them.

See also
Ancient Tamil country
Parvatha rajakulam
Velirs
Vellalar

References

Tamil society